Icyang Parod (born 2 December 1960) is a Taiwanese Amis politician. He served as the Minister of the Council of Indigenous Peoples (CIP) from 2007 to 2008 and took office again in 2016.

Education and activism
Icyang was a leader in the Taiwanese aboriginal rights movement throughout the 1980s. In 1983, he and two other National Taiwan University students established High Green Mountain, a publication that advocated for aboriginal culture. Icyang obtained his bachelor's degree in political science from National Taiwan University in 1984.

Council of Indigenous Peoples

Apology to Taiwanese aborigines
Speaking at a news conference in December 2016, Icyang said that formal apology made by President Tsai Ing-wen to the Taiwanese aboriginal communities on 1 August 2016 was the first step towards reconciliation and peace, it was also the first time for any head of state in Asia to do such thing. He said that the CIP would also plan to publish the full apology text into 16 Taiwanese aboriginal languages as well as in English and Japanese. This is also another way for the government to show their willingness in preserving and advancing the aboriginal languages.

2019 Palau visit
On 27 September until 2 October 2019, Parod and delegation make an official visit to Palau to attend the nation's independence day on 1 October. The delegation also attend the International Austronesian Language Revitalization Forum on 29 September, which is jointly organized by Council of Indigenous Peoples, Ministry of Foreign Affairs of the Republic of China, American Institute in Taiwan and Japan–Taiwan Exchange Association.

References

External links

 

1960 births
Amis people
Government ministers of Taiwan
Living people
National Taiwan University alumni
Politicians of the Republic of China on Taiwan from Hsinchu County
Taiwanese politicians of indigenous descent